Preparation theorem may refer to:

 Malgrange preparation theorem
 Weierstrass preparation theorem